Scientific method refers to the techniques used in scientific inquiry.

Scientific method may also refer to:
 "Scientific Method" (Star Trek: Voyager), an episode of Star Trek: Voyager
  Scientific method (Aristotle)
  Scientific method and religion